José Vida Soria (19 September 1937 – 3 January 2019) was a Spanish jurist and politician.

Early life 
Vida was born in Granada on 19 September 1937. He taught law at the University of Granada prior to his political career. Vida joined the Spanish Socialist Workers' Party in 1974 and represented the party in Granada during the constituent and first Congress of Deputies between 1977 and 1982. He was outside Madrid when he learned of the 1981 Spanish coup d'état attempt, and he decided to enter the congressional chambers while it was taken by the Civil Guards, knowing the risk of dying, as one of the guards told him. Vida subsequently returned to the University of Granada, serving as rector from 1984 to 1989. He was awarded the Order of Constitutional Merit and the Order of St. Raymond of Peñafort.

He died on 3 January 2019, aged 81. Vida was buried at the San Jose municipal cemetery the next day.

References

1937 births
2019 deaths
Academic staff of the University of Granada
Members of the constituent Congress of Deputies (Spain)
Members of the 1st Congress of Deputies (Spain)
20th-century Spanish lawyers
Spanish legal scholars
Spanish Socialist Workers' Party politicians
Deaths from cancer in Spain
Spanish academic administrators